The Love EP may refer to:

 The Love EP (Corinne Bailey Rae EP), 2011
 The Love EP (Tristan Prettyman EP), 2003